Cléopâtre was a 32-gun Vénus class frigate of the French Navy. She was designed by Jacques-Noël Sané, and had a coppered hull. She was launched in 1781, and the British captured her in 1793. She then served the Royal Navy as HMS Oiseau until she was broken up in 1816.

French career and capture
Cléopâtre took part in the Battle of Cuddalore in late June 1783, where she was the flagship of Suffren. 

On 19 June 1793, as she sailed off Guernsey under Lieutenant de vaisseau Mullon, she encountered , under Captain Edward Pellew. During the short but sharp action, Cléopâtre lost her mizzenmast and wheel, and the ship, being unmanageable, fell foul of Nymphe. The British then boarded and captured her in a fierce rush. Mullon, mortally wounded, died while trying to swallow his commission, which, in his dying agony, he had mistaken for the vessel's secret signals. Pellew then sent the signals to the Admiralty.

In the battle Nymphe had 23 men killed and 27 wounded. Pellew estimated the number of French casualties at about 60.

Cléopâtre was the first French frigate taken in the war. In 1847 the Admiralty awarded the Naval General Service Medal with clasp "Nymphe 18 June 1793" to the four surviving claimants from the action.

British career

French Revolutionary Wars

The Royal Navy commissioned Cléopâtre as HMS Oiseau in September 1793 under Captain Robert Murray. On 18 May 1794 he sailed her from Plymouth to Halifax in a squadron commanded by Rear-Admiral George Murray. Between 1793 and 1795, the Russian naval officer Yuri Lisyanski sailed aboard Oiseaux as a volunteer. Between 1803 and 1806 he would captain the Russian-American Company's sloop  on the first Russian circumnavigation of the world.

In June 1794 Oiseau and  seized fourteen French vessels of a convoy of 25, all loaded with flour, naval stores, beef, and pork. The vessels were American-owned and had sailed from Hampton Roads with two sets of papers, one set showing the cargo going to England and the other giving their destination as France. The British sent the vessels into Halifax.

In July, Argonaut, Oiseau, and  captured Potowmac and 
True Republican.
 
On 8 January 1795, Argonaut captured the French Republican warship  on the North America Station. Esperance was armed with 22 guns (4 and 6-pounders), and had a crew of 130 men. She was under the command of lieutenant de vaisseau de St. Laurent and had been out 56 days from Rochfort, bound for the Chesapeake. Argonaut shared the prize money with Oiseaux.

In 1798, Oiseau served in the Indian Ocean, where she captured the French Réunion on 1 September. On 21 April 1799 her boats went into Saint Denis on the Íle de Bourbon and cut out two merchant vessels, Denree, which had a cargo of bale goods and coffee, and Augustine, which had a cargo of rum and arrack. Augustine was lost in St. Augustine's Bay.

Dédaigneuse maintained her lead until 2.00 a.m. on the 28th when came within small arms range. Dédaigneuse opened fire from her stern-chasers, and the two British ships returned fire. After a running fight of 45 minutes, two miles off shore near Cape Bellem, fire primarily from Sirius had cut Dédaigneuses running rigging and sails ). She had also suffered casualties with several men having been killed, and 17 wounded, including her Captain and fifth Lieutenant. She then struck her colours. Unfavourable winds kept Amethyst, from getting up before Dédaigneuse had struck. Sirius was the only British ship to sustain any damage (rigging, sails, main-yard and bowsprit) in the encounter and there were no fatalities on the English side. Captain Linzee declared the encounter a long and anxious chase of 42 hours and acknowledged a gallant resistance on the part of Dédaigneuse. At the time of the encounter she was armed with twenty-eight 12-pounder guns. Linzee described her as "a perfect new Frigate, Copper fastened and sails well...". He sent her into Plymouth with a prize crew under the command of his first lieutenant, H. Lloyd. The Admiralty took Dédaigneuse into the Royal Navy under the same name HMS Dedaigneuse.

On 28 January, along with HMS Sirius, she captured 3 French frigates off Ferrol.

On 16 September 1800, Oiseau,  and the cutter Fly captured Neptunus when Neptunus was going into Havre de Grace. The next day  brought Neptunus into Portsmouth, together with her cargo of naval stores that Wight had captured 

In February 1801 Captain Lord Augustus Fitzroy assumed command.

In mid-afternoon on 16 March the privateer schooner Lord Nelson, Captain Humphrey Gibson, was between the Isle of Wight and Portland when a lugger came into sight, under chase by a larger vessel. Humphrey immediately changed his direction to attempt to cut the lugger off. After a chase of four hours, Lord Nelson caught up with the lugger, which immediately surrendered. The lugger turned out to be the French privateer Espoir, of 14 guns and 75 men, under the command of M. Alegis Ballet. She was two days out of Saint-Malo and had taken nothing.  There were no casualties. As Lord Nelson was taking out the prisoners Oiseau, Captain Augustus Fitzroy, came up.

Captain John Murray replaced Fitzroy in August, and was replaced in turn in December by Captain John Phillips.

Napoleonic Wars
In June 1806 Oiseau was commissioned under Lieutenant Walter Kennedy as a prison hulk at Portsmouth. In 1812 Lieutenant William Needham succeeded Kennedy. She was laid up in December, but then lent to the Transport Board.

In 1814 she was under the command of Lieutenant John Bayby Harrison. She was then put in ordinary in 1815.

Fate
Oiseau was advertised for sale on 2 September 1816, and sold for breaking up to a Mr. Rundle for £1500 on 18 September.

Notes, citations, and references
Notes

Citations

References

External links 
 
 HMS Oiseau  Naval Database

Age of Sail frigates of France
1781 ships
Frigates of the French Navy
Captured ships